John Thomas Foster (21 March 1903 – after 1936) was an English professional footballer and coach who played as an outside right. He made over 430 appearances in the Football League for seven clubs, most notably for Brentford, Halifax Town, Ashington and Barrow.

Playing career

Early years 
An outside right, Foster began his career with hometown First Division club Sunderland in August 1920. He later dropped through the leagues and had spells with Third Division North clubs Ashington, Halifax Town, Grimsby Town and won the league title with the latter club in the 1925–26 season. Foster transferred to Third Division South club Bristol City in June 1926 and won the league title in his first season with the Robins. After two seasons in the Second Division, Foster departed Ashton Gate in May 1929.

Brentford 
Foster and Bristol City teammate Cyril Blakemore joined Third Division South club Brentford in May 1929, for a combined fee of £500. He was a virtual ever-present until the 1932–33 season, when he made just 22 appearances, but still contributed to the Bees' Third Division South title. Foster departed Griffin Park in 1933, having made 153 appearances and scored 21 goals for the club.

Later career 
Foster signed for Third Division North club Barrow in July 1933 and scored 16 goals during the 1933–34 season. He later moved to Birmingham & District League club Colwyn Bay United.

Coaching career 
After retiring from football, Foster had a spell coaching in Belgium.

Personal life 
Foster's brother Jimmy was also a footballer and was on the books at Brentford, but failed to make an appearance for the first team.

Honours 
 Grimsby Town 
Football League Third Division North: 1925–26
Bristol City
Football League Third Division South: 1926–27
Brentford
 Football League Division Three South: 1932–33

Career statistics

References

1903 births
Year of death missing
Footballers from Sunderland
English footballers
Association football outside forwards
Murton A.F.C. players
Brentford F.C. players
Sunderland A.F.C. players
Ashington A.F.C. players
Halifax Town A.F.C. players
Grimsby Town F.C. players
Bristol City F.C. players
Barrow A.F.C. players
Colwyn Bay F.C. players
English Football League players
English expatriate sportspeople in Belgium